The San Gabriel Mountains National Monument is a United States National Monument managed by the U.S. Forest Service, which encompasses parts of the Angeles National Forest and the San Bernardino National Forest in California. On October 10, 2014, President Barack Obama used his authority under the Antiquities Act to create the new monument, protecting 346,177 acres of public lands in the San Gabriel Mountains of the Transverse Ranges. The effort to protect the San Gabriel Mountains began more than a century earlier, in 1891 with another U.S. President, Benjamin Harrison, the 23rd president, using a congressional act, to designate and delineate the first federal protection in the United States of forested lands, using the same mountain range name, as the San Gabriel Timberland Reserve.  Two earlier California conservationists, Abbot Kinney and John Muir, influenced President Benjamin Harrison.

Geography

The monument covers the central and northern regions of the San Gabriel Mountains, extending west to east from Upper Sand Canyon at Little Tujunga Canyon Road to Telegraph Peak. It contains the Sheep Mountain Wilderness, the San Gabriel Wilderness, and Pleasant View Ridge Wilderness. Most of the major peaks of the San Gabriels are within the limits of the monument, including Mount San Antonio, Mount Baden-Powell, and Throop Peak. The Silver Moccasin Trail lies within the monument. The monument only covers a limited portion of the range's western extent, and much of the southern portion of the range has been excluded from the  monument. It does not contain the Cucamonga Peak region.

Monument history
The movement to further preserve the San Gabriel Mountains began in 2003 when then Congresswoman Hilda Solis initiated an environmental feasibility report to see if it was possible to increase protection by National Monument designation.

Establishment of the National Monument

The National Monument was established on October 10, 2014, by proclamation of President Barack Obama under the Antiquities Act. More than 15 million people live within 90 minutes of the San Gabriel Mountains, which provides 70 percent of the open space for Angeleños and 30 percent of their drinking water. Polling indicated that 80 percent of Los Angeles County voters supported the proposed protection of the San Gabriel Mountains and rivers.

The creation of the monument was in response to decades of input and support from the local community demanding greater environmental protections for the heavily touristed region. There have been longstanding concerns about pollution and vandalism in the region's subalpine forests and watersheds. Public health and Latino groups also advocated for protecting the public lands in the San Gabriel Mountains as an opportunity to protect access to open space and outdoor recreation as a way to counter the shortage of parks and open space in Los Angeles County which they claim has contributed to high childhood obesity rates.

The Obama administration cited the presence of endangered species, important cultural resources, and the threat of unreliable funding for management and encroaching development as the proximal reasons for the establishment of the monument. In addition, all existing rights-of-way continue to be honored and existing recreational activities — such as hiking, camping, fishing and cycling — will be unaffected.

Local officials, including Los Angeles Mayor Eric Garcetti, cheered the news along with Hispanic, recreation, and conservation groups. Its establishment faced limited opposition from local residents. To alleviate concerns, the extent of the monument does not cover most of the southern slopes of the San Gabriel Mountains, and excludes towns in the region.

See also

List of national monuments of the United States

References

External links
San Gabriel Mountains National Monument at fs.fed.us
U.S. Forest Service: detailed map of San Gabriel Mountains National Monument
Remarks by the President at Designation of the San Gabriel Mountains as a National Monument

 
National Monuments in California

Protected areas of Los Angeles County, California

.
United States Forest Service National Monuments
National Monuments designated by Barack Obama
Protected areas established in 2014
2014 establishments in California